Alison Smyth may refer to:

Alison Smyth (actress)
Alison Smyth (footballer)

See also 
 Allison Smith (disambiguation)